Michael Minkler (born 14 May 1952) is a motion picture sound re-recording mixer. He has received Academy Awards for his work on Dreamgirls, Chicago and Black Hawk Down. His varied career has also included films like Inglourious Basterds, JFK and Star Wars, as well as television programs like The Pacific and John Adams. Minkler works at Todd-AO Hollywood. He is also the Managing Director of Moving Pictures Media Group, a company that specializes in film development, packaging projects for production funding acquisition.

Early career
Minkler started working as a recordist when he was 17, and started mixing in 1974 when he was 22. His early projects included commercials, television shows and industrial films. His first major film came in 1976 when he was hired for temporary work on music and effects tracks for the foreign release of All the President's Men, with rerecording mixers Arthur Piantadosi and Les Fresholtz, at Warner Brothers' Stage 5. He continued to work with Piantadosi and Fresholtz on another 35 films, and considers them his mentors.

Family history
Born and raised in Los Angeles, California, Minkler was born into a family of sound-for-film professionals.

Darrell Minkler, his grandfather, worked at Chicago Labs in 1928, developing disc recorders. He came to Hollywood to work on the Vitaphone project at Warner Bros. Studios. Darrell Minkler also built a company then called Radio Recorders for music recording with such pop classic performers as Frank Sinatra, Bing Crosby and Tommy Dorsey. That studio later became a part of The Record Plant.

Don Minkler, his father, began his sound career in the late 1940s and founded Producers Sound Service in 1964. Don Minkler's re-recording career includes such films as Easy Rider, Five Easy Pieces, The Last Picture Show and Beyond the Valley of the Dolls.

His uncle, sound re-recording mixer Bob Minkler began working in the sound department back in the 1960s and won an Oscar in 1978 for his work on Star Wars: Episode IV – A New Hope. Other Bob Minkler credits include 10, Hair and Bull Durham and Saturday Night Fever.
His other uncle, Lee, also a mixer, shares the distinction of being on the Oscar Nominated Sound Mixing team for Tron with Michael and Bob. That is the only time that three members of a single family were nominated for an Oscar for the same film.

Minkler's son, Christian P. Minkler, is also a re-recording mixer, who has worked on both television and feature film projects since 1990. Christian's most recent credits include Repo Man, The Proposal and Role Models.

Professional experience
After a four year stint at Warner Bros. Studios, he took the job as the chief mixer and managing director of facilities, at Robert Altman's Lion's Gate Films in 1980. In 1984, Minkler struck out as an independent, working at a number of facilities, until 1990 when he helped design and staff Skywalker Sound's Lantana facility in Santa Monica. He continued to mix there after the facility was acquired by Todd-AO. While at renamed Todd-AO West, Minkler won a pair of Academy Awards, first for Black Hawk Down in 2001 and then Dreamgirls in 2006. In 2009, he moved to the Todd-AO Hollywood facility and quickly earned an Academy Award nomination for Inglourious Basterds.

Technical Advisor
In addition to his mixing credits, Minkler has been a sought after technical advisor for companies like Euphonix where he helped with the development of digital audio mixing technology, which is now an industry standard.

Minkler has always been considered an innovator of technology and technique.
On Inglourious Basterds, Minkler utilized a new technology developed by Penteo Surround that enables stereo music mixes to be converted and spread across a 5.1 surround sound field.

Appears on
While Minkler is regularly profiled in trades magazines like Variety, Mix and Post, he's also appeared on DVD featurettes discussing the sound of a particular film. The Sound of Miracle appears as an extra on the DVD release of the 2004 film Miracle.

Awards and nominations
Michael Minkler has been nominated for 12 Academy Awards (three wins), six BAFTA Awards (three wins), eight Cinema Audio Society Awards (two wins), one Motion Picture Sound Editors Awards (one win), two Emmy Award (one win) and four Satellite Awards (three wins).

In 2006, Minkler received the Cinema Audio Society's Career Achievement Award at the 42nd annual CAS Awards Banquet. The event took place at the Millennium-Biltmore in Los Angeles. He was the president of the Cinema Audio Society in 1981.

 Academy Awards
 2021: Greyhound (Best Sound) – Nominated
 2020: Once Upon a Time in Hollywood (Best Sound Mixing) – Nominated
 2010: Inglourious Basterds (Best Sound Mixing) – Nominated
 2007: Dreamgirls (Best Sound Mixing) – Won
 2003: Chicago (Best Sound) – Won
 2002: Black Hawk Down (Best Sound) – Won
 1994: Cliffhanger (Best Sound) – Nominated
 1992: JFK (Best Sound) – Nominated
 1990: Born on the Fourth of July (Best Sound) – Nominated
 1986: A Chorus Line (Best Sound) – Nominated
 1983: Tron (Best Sound) – Nominated
 1981: Altered States (Best Sound) – Nominated
 1980: The Electric Horseman (Best Sound) – Nominated

 BAFTA Awards
 2021: Greyhound (Best Sound) – Nominated
 2005: Collateral (Best Sound) – Nominated
 2004: Kill Bill: Vol. 1 (Best Sound) – Nominated
 2003: Chicago (Best Sound) – Won
 2002: Black Hawk Down (Best Sound) – Nominated
 1993: JFK (Best Sound) – Won
 1979: Star Wars: Episode IV – A New Hope (Best Sound) – Won

 Cinema Audio Society Awards
 2021: Greyhound (Outstanding Achievement in Sound Mixing for a Motion Picture – Live Action) – Nominated
 2009: John Adams (Outstanding Achievement in Sound Mixing for Television Movies and Mini-Series for episode Join or Die) – Won
 2009: John Adams (Outstanding Achievement in Sound Mixing for Television Movies and Mini-Series for episode Independence) – Nominated
 2008: Into the Wild (Outstanding Achievement in Sound Mixing for Motion Pictures) – Nominated
 2007: Dreamgirls (Outstanding Achievement in Sound Mixing for Motion Pictures) – Won
 2003: Chicago (Outstanding Achievement in Sound Mixing for Motion Pictures) – Nominated
 2002: Black Hawk Down (Outstanding Achievement in Sound Mixing for Motion Pictures) – Nominated
 1995: True Lies (Outstanding Achievement in Sound Mixing for Motion Pictures) – Nominated
 1994: Cliffhanger (Outstanding Achievement in Sound Mixing for a Feature Film) – Nominated

 Motion Picture Sound Editors - Golden Reel Award
 2021: Greyhound (Best Sound Editing – Dialogue/ADR) – Nominated
 2021: Greyhound (Best Sound Editing – Effects/Foley) – Nominated
 1990: Born on the Fourth of July (Best Sound Editing - Sound Effects) – Won (Tied with The Abyss)

 Primetime Emmy Awards
 2010: The Pacific (Outstanding Sound Mixing for a Miniseries or a Movie for the episode Part Two) - Won
 2008: John Adams (Outstanding Sound Mixing for a Miniseries or a Movie for the episode Join or Die) – Nominated

 Satellite Awards
 2010: The Town (Best Sound, Editing & Mixing) - Won
 2006: Dreamgirls (Best Sound, Editing & Mixing) – Won
 2005: Collateral (Best Sound, Editing & Mixing) – Won
 2004: Kill Bill: Vol. 1 (Best Sound) – Nominated

Controversy
After winning the Oscar in 2007 for his work on Dreamgirls, Minkler exchanged the following dialogue with a reporter:

Several online publications found the comments to be controversial, surprising, or otherwise noteworthy, with one referring to Minkler specifically as being a "Sore Winner". L.A. Times contributor Tom O'Neil reported on the event after contacting O'Connell, receiving the following response from him:

Minkler apologized to O'Connell within a few weeks of making his original remarks in an open letter, and by calling and speaking to him personally, as referenced in the letter. Minkler framed his apology with the statement, "A very unfortunate situation has developed because of my stupid answers to some inappropriate questions. I did not seek this spotlight—the press did, as they have in the past. It was wrong of them to ask the questions, and wrong, wrong, wrong of me to answer them the way that I did."

Writing on the controversy once again, Tom O'Neil characterized the apology in his LA Times blog as, "Minkler blames the media for his bashing of O'Connell." As reported in the updated article, O'Connell accepted the apology cordially with the statement, "I think it is time for all of us to move on in the best interest of the sound community, and put this behind us."

References

External links
 
 Moving Pictures Media Group
 Michael Minkler Bio at Todd-AO website
 A video profile of the work done on Inglourious Basterds by the SoundWorks Collection
 Article at Mix magazine covering Minkler moving to Todd-AO Hollywood
 CSS Studios Company Blog with Minkler news
 The Oscars Nominee Questionnaire for Inglourious Basterds nomination
 WordPress Blog Entries covering Michael Minkler
 Story about Michael Minkler's CAS Award win for Dreamgirls
 Article about Michael Minkler's 2010 Oscar Nominations at ProSoundWeb
 Article at The Hollywood Reporter covering the work done on Inglourious Basterds written by Debra Kaufman
 Michael Minkler Information at Freebase

1952 births
Living people
American audio engineers
Best Sound BAFTA Award winners
Best Sound Mixing Academy Award winners
CAS Career Achievement Award honorees
People from Los Angeles